Trachysomus is a genus of longhorn beetles of the subfamily Lamiinae,

Species
 Trachysomus apipunga Martins & Galileo, 2008
 Trachysomus arriagadai Galileo & Martins, 1991
 Trachysomus buquetii Thomson, 1858
 Trachysomus camelus Buquet, 1852
 Trachysomus cavigibba Martins, 1975
 Trachysomus clarkei Martins & Galileo, 2009
 Trachysomus fragifer (Kirby, 1818)
 Trachysomus gibbosus Buquet, 1852
 Trachysomus hydaspes Dillon & Dillon, 1946
 Trachysomus luederwaldti Martins, 1975
 Trachysomus mexicanus Dillon & Dillon, 1946
 Trachysomus peregrinus Thomson, 1858
 Trachysomus santarensis Bates, 1865
 Trachysomus surdus Dillon & Dillon, 1946
 Trachysomus thomsoni Aurivillius, 1923
 Trachysomus verrucosus (Olivier, 1797)
 Trachysomus wappesi Martins & Galileo, 2009

References

Onciderini